ʻArish or el-ʻArīsh (Hrinokorura) is the capital and largest city (with 164,830 inhabitants ) of the North Sinai Governorate of Egypt, as well as the largest city on the Sinai Peninsula, lying on the Mediterranean coast  northeast of Cairo and  west of the Egypt-Gaza border.

The Azzaraniq Protectorate is on the eastern side of ʻArīsh.

History 

 
The earliest historical reference to the city is found in the Septuagint, Isaiah 27:12. The city grew around a Bedouin settlement near the ancient Ptolemaic outpost of Rhinocorura (in Greek "the place where noses (of criminals) are cut off"). In the Middle Ages, pilgrims misidentified the site as the Sukkot of the Bible.  means "palm huts" in Modern Standard Arabic. M. Ignace de Rossi derived the Arabic name from the Egyptian , an analogue of Greek Rhinocorura.

New fortifications were constructed at the original site by the Ottoman Empire in 1560. During the Napoleonic Wars, the French laid siege to the fort, which fell after 11 days on February 19, 1799. During World War I, the fort was destroyed by British bombers. It was later the location of the 45th Stationary Hospital which treated casualties of the  Palestine campaign. The remains of those who died there were later moved to Kantara Cemetery. 

Theodor Herzl, the founder of Zionism, proposed ʻArīsh as a Jewish homeland since neither the Sultan nor the Kaiser supported settlement in Palestine. In 1903, Joseph Chamberlain, the British colonial secretary, agreed to consider ʻArīsh, and Herzl commissioned the lawyer David Lloyd George a charter draft, but his application was turned down once an expedition, led by Leopold Kessler had returned and submitted a detailed report to Herzl, which outlined a proposal to divert some of the Nile waters to the area for the purpose of settlement.

El-ʻArīsh Military Cemetery was built in 1919 marked the dead of World War I. It was designed by Robert Lorimer.

On December 8, 1958, an air battle occurred between Egyptian and Israeli air forces over ʻArīsh. ʻArīsh was under military occupation by Israel briefly in 1956 and again from 1967 to 1979. It was returned to Egypt in 1979 after the signing of the Egypt–Israel peace treaty.

On 9 February 2021 six locals were killed by ISIL militants.

Geography
North Sinai is targeted by Egyptian government planners to divert population growth from the high-density Nile Delta. It is proposed that by completing infrastructure, transportation and irrigation projects, three million Egyptians may be settled in North Sinai.

Arish is the closest city to Lake Bardawil.

Transport 
The city is served by el Arish International Airport. The Northern Coastal Highway runs from el-Qantarah at the Suez Canal through Arish to the Gaza border crossing at Rafah. The railway line from Cairo is under re-construction with formation works completed only as far as Bir al-Abed, west of Arish. The route was formerly part of the Palestine Railways built during World War I and World War II to connect Egypt with Turkey. The railway was cut during the formation of Israel. 

The city is the site of a deep-water seaport capable of serving ships up to 30,000 tonnes, the only such port on the Sinai Peninsula. Its major exports are cement, sand, salt and marble.

Climate 
Its Köppen climate classification is hot desert (BWh), although prevailing Mediterranean winds moderate its temperatures, typical to the rest of the northern coast of Egypt.

See also

 List of cities and towns in Egypt
 Sinai and Palestine Campaign

References 

Cities in Egypt
Governorate capitals in Egypt
Populated coastal places in Egypt
Populated places in North Sinai Governorate
Tourism in Egypt
Ports and harbours of the Arab League
Transport in the Arab League